Pyhäntä is a municipality of Finland. It is located in the Northern Ostrobothnia region. The municipality has a population of 
which 
is water. The population density is
. The municipality is unilingually Finnish.

Geography 
Neighbouring municipalities are Kajaani, Kiuruvesi, Kärsämäki, Pyhäjärvi, Siikalatva, and Vieremä.

Nature
There are several conservation areas located in the municipality. About 60% of the area is covered by swamps. Surface variation is larger compared to typical flat landscape in Ostrobothnia. One of the biggest lakes in the region is Iso Lamujärvi.

Villages 
 Ahokylä
 Ojalankylä
 Lamujoki
 Tavastkenkä
 Viitamäki

References

External links

Municipality of Pyhäntä – Official website 

 
Populated places established in 1899